Russell Dean Critchfield (born June 27, 1946, in Salinas, California) is an American former professional basketball player.

A 5'10" guard, Critchfield played at the University of California, Berkeley in the late 1960s, earning team MVP honors in 1966, 1967, and 1968. He scored 1,437 points in his college career and was a first-team All-American selection in 1968. He was also selected twice to the All-AAWU first team (1967–1968). Critchfield was not drafted by an NBA team but was drafted by and played one season (1968–69) with the Oakland Oaks of the American Basketball Association. He scored 161 points in 47 regular season games and won an ABA Championship.

Critchfield is currently Assistant men's basketball coach at Chico State University in Chico CA.

Notes

1946 births
Living people
American men's basketball coaches
American men's basketball players
Basketball coaches from California
Basketball players from California
California Golden Bears men's basketball coaches
California Golden Bears men's basketball players
High school basketball coaches in the United States
Junior college men's basketball coaches in the United States
Oakland Oaks draft picks
Oakland Oaks players
Saint Mary's Gaels men's basketball coaches
San Diego State Aztecs men's basketball coaches
Sportspeople from Salinas, California
Washington Huskies men's basketball coaches
Point guards